Ranjit "Ranj" Singh Sangha (born 26 June 1979) is a British doctor, television presenter, author and columnist. He is best known as a celebrity dancer on the BBC One dance series Strictly Come Dancing, and co-creating and presenting the CBeebies show Get Well Soon from 2012 to 2015. He also appears on ITV This Morning, as a resident doctor, as well as co-hosting ITV Save Money: Good Health alongside Sian Williams. He won the ITV series Cooking with the Stars in 2022.

Career 
Singh is an NHS clinician, having trained in London and worked in several hospitals as a specialist in paediatric emergency medicine. Singh became a member of The Royal College of Paediatrics and Child Health in 2007.  

His television career began in 2012, having become the presenter for Get Well Soon, a children's television show airing on CBeebies, which he co-created with Kindle Entertainment. In 2016, the show received a children's BAFTA award in the Interactive - Adapted category.

Singh has become a prominent contributor to factual programming and documentaries, appearing on This Morning as a resident doctor and on 20 July 2018, he was a guest presenter on the show, alongside Vanessa Feltz. He has also contributed to a range of other programmes such as Inside Out, 5 News and Good Morning Britain. Ranj also appears regularly on various quiz shows and celebrity specials and in 2017, he won BBC's Pointless Celebrities, alongside Hilary Jones.

In August 2018, it was announced that Singh would be a contestant on the sixteenth series of Strictly Come Dancing. He was partnered with Janette Manrara and was the sixth contestant to be eliminated. Following his stint on Strictly, Singh became host of his own medical advice show called 'Dr Ranj:ON Call' which began airing on ITV in March 2020.

Outside of his work on Television, Singh has become the author of two children's educational books: Food Fuel and Skelebones, a Sunday Times bestselling cookbook and is a contributor and columnist for Al Jazeera, Attitude magazine and NetDoctor.

During the 2020 COVID-19 pandemic, Singh stepped back from his media work to focus on supporting the NHS in his role as a paediatric emergency medicine specialist. During the crisis, Ranj regularly used his platform to debunk the rise in misleading information confusing parents and the general public,  with concern that many are being 'duped' by rumours with even celebrities sharing 'fake' information.

He was one of the four competitors who took part in the Christmas special edition of The Great British Sewing Bee that was transmitted on Boxing day 2020 on BBC One. His fellow competitors in the programme were Denise Van Outen, Shirley Ballas and Sara Pascoe.

In April 2021, Singh announced he would be appearing in his own West End musical for a new one-off show called Scrubs to Sparkles, following his vocal performances on television show All Star Musicals in March 2021.

From August to November 2021, Singh hosted the TV series Extreme Food Phobics, in which applicants would come to cure their food phobias.

In December 2021, Singh appeared as a contestant on a Strictly Come Dancing Special that was also the first episode of the revival series of the BBC game show The Weakest Link hosted by Romesh Ranganathan.

Personal life 
Singh has two brothers Jaskaranjit and Gopi, he grew up in a traditionally Sikh household, and focused on schoolwork gaining his first GCSE at just eight years old, he has two brothers.  

Singh married Sulvinder Samra, a pharmacist, at a traditional Sikh ceremony in Nottingham in 2005, and divorced in 2011. Singh came out as gay at the age of 30 in 2009 to his wife.

He has discussed his sexuality in an interview for Attitude magazine in 2015 and in 2018 fronted the cover of Gay Times magazine as part of a special 'gaysian' celebration of LGBTQ Asians. 

Ranj has been an advocate for LGBTQ rights, especially among minorities, and won the Attitude TV Award in 2019 where he spoke about how "People from ethnic minorities, people of colour, or LGBT people are still at a slight disadvantage" in the media. He is an advocate for LGBTQ+ inclusive education.

Filmography

Television

Bibliography

Non-fiction
 Save Money Lose Weight : London: Transworld Publishers: 2019:

Children's Non-fiction 
 Food Fuel, Level 9 Illustrated by David Semple : London: Oxford University Press: 2015: 
 Skelebones, Level 10 Illustrated by David Semple : London: Oxford University Press: 2015: 
 How To Grow Up Shah Rukh Khan: The No Worries Guide For BOYS: Illustrated by David O' Connell : London: Hachette Children's Group: 2021:

Awards

References

External links 
 

1979 births
Living people
English television presenters
People from Medway
English LGBT broadcasters
English gay writers
English people of Punjabi descent